Wollaston Lake is a lake in north-eastern Saskatchewan, Canada.

About 10% of the lake's water drains into the Fond du Lac River, which flows out of the lake to the north-west, where it drains into Lake Athabasca, which ultimately drains into the Arctic Ocean via the Mackenzie River system. The rest of the water drains into the Cochrane River, which flows out of the north-eastern side of the lake and into Reindeer Lake, which drains via the Churchill River system into Hudson Bay.

Wollaston Lake's main inflow is the Geikie River which flows from the south-west into the south-west section of the lake. If Hudson Bay is considered an arm of the Atlantic Ocean, then the Geikie is the largest river in the world to flow naturally into two oceans.

Wollaston Lake is also the largest lake entirely within Saskatchewan, although the Saskatchewanian portions of Lake Athabasca and Reindeer Lake are both larger.

Samuel Hearne learned of the lake in 1770 and David Thompson noted in 1796 the dual outlets as "perhaps without parallel in the world." In 1807, Peter Fidler named the lake after William Hyde Wollaston.

The only settlement on its shores is also named Wollaston Lake. The settlement includes the northern hamlet of Wollaston Lake with a population of 129  and the adjacent village of Wollaston Post of the Hatchet Lake Dene Nation with a population of 1251.

Access
Access to the lake is provided by the community airstrip (Wollaston Lake Airport) and an all-weather road (Highway 905) to La Ronge. This road passes by the western side of the lake, while the community of Wollaston Lake is located on the eastern side, but the lake can be crossed by a winter road when the lake is frozen (November through June) and by the Wollaston barge when it is not. Air service is also provided to Points North Landing, a service centre for nearby uranium mines. This industry provides jobs for local residents, but has raised concerns over possible contamination of the lake.

On the west side of the lake at Collins Bay, near Collins Creek, is Collins Bay Airport. Also on the west side of the lake, near Hidden Bay, is an abandoned airport called Hidden Bay Airport.

At the southern end of the lake at Nekweaga Bay is a Nekweaga Bay Airport. It is a private airport that provides access to Wilderness Family Outfitters.

Rise Air provides daily flights connecting Wollaston Lake with Stony Rapids, Fond Du Lac, La Ronge, Prince Albert and Saskatoon.

Wollaston Lake (Hidden Bay) Recreation Site
Wollaston Recreation Site (58°6′2″N, 103°47′25″W), also known as Hidden Bay Campground, is a provincially run park located on the north bank of Umpherville River near its mouth where it empties into Hidden Bay of Wollaston Lake. The campground features 12 campsites, a boat launch, a fish cleaning station, and a picnic area.

Wild fires completely burned the campground and it is closed until further notice.

The park is located on kilometre 240 of Highway 905, 260 km north of the community of Southend.

Fish species
Fish species found in the lake include walleye, yellow perch, northern pike, lake trout, Arctic grayling, lake whitefish, cisco, burbot, white sucker, and longnose sucker.

Treated effluent from the Rabbit Lake uranium mine is released into Hidden Bay on the south-western side of the lake.

See also 
List of lakes of Saskatchewan

References

External links
Fish Species of Saskatchewan
Encyclopedia of Saskatchewan

Lakes of Saskatchewan
Inland navigations
Glacial lakes of Canada
Bifurcation lakes